Hulda Maria Charlotte Kulle (born 26 April 1960 in Svalöv Municipality) is a Swedish actress. The daughter of Jarl Kulle and Louise Hermelin earlier was married to Lars-Erik Berenett.

Kulle studied at Teaterhögskolan i Malmö 1985–88 and after that she works/has worked at Malmö, Stockholm and Helsingborg City Theatre. In 2005 she received a Guldbagge for her role as Anna in the 2004 film Four Shades of Brown. In 2011 she received Helsingborgs Dagblads kulturpris.

Filmography

Film
The Pitfall (1989)
The Tattooed Widow (1998)
Deadline (2001)
Kim Novak badade aldrig i Genesarets sjö (2005)
Allt om min buske (2007)
Everlasting Moments (2008)
Ted – För kärlekens skull (2018)

Television
Wallander (2006)
Gynekologen i Askim (2007–2011)
Bibliotekstjuven (2011)
Crimes of Passion (2013)
Fröken Frimans krig (2013–17)
The Bridge (2015–18)

References

External links

Swedish Film Database

Swedish actresses
Living people
1960 births
People from Svalöv Municipality
Best Actress Guldbagge Award winners